Kafru Bavakeh (also Romanized as Kafrū Bāvakeh; also known as Kafrū Bābākīyeh-e Şayyādī) is a village in Posht Tang Rural District, in the Central District of Sarpol-e Zahab County, Kermanshah Province, Iran. At the 2006 census, its population was 119, in 21 families.

References 

Populated places in Sarpol-e Zahab County